The Dallas–Fort Worth Film Critics Association Award for Best Supporting Actress is an award presented by the Dallas–Fort Worth Film Critics Association. It is given in honor of an actress who has delivered an outstanding performance in a supporting role.

Winners
 † = Winner of the Academy Award for Best Supporting Actress

1990s

2000s

2010s

2020s

References

External links
 Official website

Supporting Actress
Film awards for supporting actress